The America Zone was one of the two regional zones of the 1931 International Lawn Tennis Challenge.

Due to an increase in South American entries, the America Zone was split into the North & Central America Zone and the South America Zone. The winner of each sub-zone would play against each other to determine who moved to the Inter-Zonal Final to compete against the winner of the Europe Zone. 8 teams entered the America Zone: 3 teams competed in the North & Central America Zone, while 5 teams competed in the South America Zone.

The United States defeated Canada in the North & Central America Zone final, and Argentina defeated Chile in the South America Zone final. In the Americas Inter-Zonal Final, the United States defeated Argentina and went on to face Great Britain in the Inter-Zonal Final.

North & Central America Zone

Draw

Semifinals

Mexico vs. United States

Final

Canada vs. United States

South America Zone

Draw

Quarterfinals

Paraguay vs. Argentina

Semifinals

Argentina vs. Uruguay

Final

Chile vs. Argentina

Americas Inter-Zonal Final

United States vs. Argentina

References

External links
Davis Cup official website

Davis Cup Americas Zone
America Zone
International Lawn Tennis Challenge